Fréville is the name or part of the name of the following communes in France:

 Fréville, Seine-Maritime, in the Seine-Maritime department
 Fréville, Vosges, in the Vosges department
 Fréville-du-Gâtinais, in the Loiret department